Patrick Hasburgh is an American television producer and writer.

He is best known for his work on the television series Hardcastle and McCormick and 21 Jump Street, two series he co-created with Stephen J. Cannell. His other television credits include The Greatest American Hero, The A-Team, SeaQuest 2032 and L.A. Firefighters.

In 1993, he wrote and directed the feature film Aspen Extreme.

In 2004, Thomas Dunne Books  published his first novel (mystery), Aspen Pulp.

In 2018 Patrick Hasburgh wrote and published PIRATA.

References

External links

Directed by Patrick Hasburgh 21 Jump Street

American film directors
American male screenwriters
American television producers
American television writers
Living people
Place of birth missing (living people)
Year of birth missing (living people)
Barber Pro Series drivers
American male television writers